St. Paul's Episcopal Church is a historic church at 72 N. Shilling Avenue in Blackfoot, Idaho.  It was started in 1891 and was added to the National Register in 1979.

It is a small wood frame Late Gothic Revival church.

It is one of Blackfoot's oldest buildings.  It was the first church building in the Mission of the Holy Innocents, one of eight Idaho missions organized by Daniel Tuttle, and it is one of Blackfoot's oldest buildings.  It was designed by Hailey architect C.W.C. Van Winkle and was built for $1675 by Blackfoot builder R. H. Hopkins.

References

Episcopal church buildings in Idaho
Churches on the National Register of Historic Places in Idaho
Carpenter Gothic church buildings in Idaho
Churches completed in 1891
Buildings and structures in Bingham County, Idaho
19th-century Episcopal church buildings
National Register of Historic Places in Bingham County, Idaho
Blackfoot, Idaho